Basketball  at the 2022 European Youth Summer Olympic Festival will be held at the Badin Basketball Hall in Badín, Slovakia and University Basketball Hall in Banská Bystrica, Slovakia from 25 to 30 July 2022.

Medalists

Participating nations
A total of 192 athletes from 12 nations competed in basketball at the 2022 European Youth Summer Olympic Festival:

 (12)
 (12)
 (12)
 (12)
 (24)
 (24)
 (12)
 (12)
 (24)
 (12)
 (24)
 (12)

References

European Youth Summer Olympic Festival
2022 European Youth Summer Olympic Festival
International youth basketball competitions hosted by Slovakia
2022